Ferlavirus, also referred to as Ophidian paramyxovirus, is a genus of viruses in the family Paramyxoviridae, order Mononegavirales. Reptiles serve as natural hosts. There is currently only one species in this genus (Reptilian ferlavirus) to accommodate a single virus, Fer-de-Lance virus (FDLV).

Structure
Ferlaviruses produce virions that are enveloped, with spherical geometries. The virion diameter is around 150 nm. Ferlavirus genome is linear and around 15 kb in length. The genome codes for 8 proteins.

Life cycle
Viral replication is cytoplasmic. Entry into the host cell is achieved by virus attaches to host cell. Replication follows the negative stranded RNA virus replication model. Negative stranded RNA virus transcription, using polymerase stuttering is the method of transcription. The virus exits the host cell by budding. Reptiles serve as the natural host.

References

External links
 ICTV Report: Paramyxoviridae
 Viralzone: Ferlavirus

Paramyxoviridae
Virus genera